The Vital Message was written by Arthur Conan Doyle. It was first published in Britain in 1919 by Hodder & Stoughton.

External links
 

Books by Arthur Conan Doyle
1919 books